is a Japanese actress. She has played Taka in the 55th NHK taiga drama Sanada Maru, Sari Ishikawa in the film Pink and Gray, and Taka Kōda in the 99th NHK asadora Manpuku, among numerous other TV and film roles. Her lead performance in the 2017 film Goodbye, Grandpa! earned a Best Newcomer Award at the 39th Yokohama Film Festival.

Biography
Kishii was born in 1992 in Kanagawa Prefecture, Japan. She made her acting debut in 2009 as elementary school student Nana Sakurai in the drama . After a series of minor film and TV appearances, in 2015 she played the role of Taeko Hakozaki, a girl whose friend falls in love with Taeko's father, in the Kenji Yamauchi film , as well as the supporting role of Kanako in the TBS drama .

The next year Kishii landed several more TV and film roles. She also appeared in film adaptations of the debut Shigeaki Kato novel Pink and Gray and the Mariko Koike novel , and played the role of Taka, Nobushige's third wife, in the 55th NHK taiga drama Sanada Maru.

Kishii's first lead film role came in the 2017 Yukihiro Morigaki film  as Yoshiko Haruno, the granddaughter of a recently deceased family patriarch.  Sarah Ward of Screen Daily described her performance as "especially impressive, her wise-beyond-her-years demeanour helping to flesh out a protagonist largely tasked with observing everyone around her". Kishii's performance in Goodbye, Grandpa! won her a Best Newcomer Award at the 39th Yokohama Film Festival.  That same year she played Sumire Michibata in the TBS television series  and Miyuki Asakawa in the Kiyoshi Kurosawa science fiction drama Foreboding on Wowow. In 2018 Kishii took on roles in two NHK dramas: the drama , as middle school teacher Shiori Mochozuki; and Manpuku, the 99th NHK asadora, as Taka Kōda.  She also appeared in the Fuji TV adaptation of The Count of Monte Cristo.

Filmography

Film

Television

Awards and nominations

References

External links
  

21st-century Japanese actresses
1992 births
Living people
Actresses from Kanagawa Prefecture